The 1994 San Diego Chargers season was the team's 35th, its 25th in the National Football League (NFL), and its 34th in San Diego. It would be the first season the franchise would have involving long snapper David Binn. He would play 17 seasons as a San Diego Charger, a franchise record.

The 1994 season began with the team trying to improve on their 8–8 record in 1993. The offense had undergone a major overhaul, with the club leaders in rushing and receiving yards (Marion Butts and Anthony Miller) both having been traded during the offseason. 2nd year running back Natrone Means took over the lead rusher role, setting a club record with 1,350 yards during the regular season. At wide receiver, the trio of Tony Martin, Shawn Jefferson and Mark Seay combined for over 2,000 yards. On defense, Junior Seau and Leslie O'Neal were again the club leaders in tackles and sacks respectively; Stanley Richard ran two of his four interceptions back for touchdowns. Future All-Pro safety Rodney Harrison joined the team as a 5th round draft pick, but primarily played on special teams, where the Chargers had four touchdowns on kick returns and John Carney led the league in scoring.

San Diego won their first six games en route to an 11–5 record, and were crowned AFC West Champions. After a 17–13 victory over the Pittsburgh Steelers in the AFC Championship game, they would advance to Super Bowl XXIX, only to lose to the San Francisco 49ers 49–26 at Joe Robbie Stadium. To date, this is the Chargers' only Super Bowl appearance.

Offseason

NFL Draft

Undrafted free agents

Personnel

Staff

Roster

Regular season

Schedule 

Note: Intra-division opponents are in bold text.

Game summaries

Week 1: at Denver Broncos 

The Chargers recovered from an early eighteen point deficit to win their opener, aided by key defensive plays at the end of each half. Down 17-0 and 24-6, the Chargers rallied to lead 27-24, thanks to three Stan Humphries touchdown passes and a 99 yard interception return by Stanley Richard as time expired in the 1st half. Later, San Diego drove 89 yards in 19 plays, converting five 3rd downs and taking 10 minutes off the clock, capping the drive with a 1 yard Natrone Means touchdown run; this put them ahead 37-34, with 3:01 remaining. John Elway responded by leading the Broncos from their own 25 yard line to the Chargers' 3, but on 2nd and goal, Elway fumbled as he attempted to throw, and Junior Seau recovered with 35 seconds left to clinch the win.

Week 2: vs Cincinnati Bengals 

San Diego started 2-0 for the first time in 13 years, courtesy of a straightforward win over the Bengals. Mark Seay caught 8 passes for 119 yards and two touchdowns, while Natrone Means rushed 21 times for 107 yards and one score. The scoreline was identical to the teams' previous meeting.

Week 3: at Seattle Seahawks 

A pair of big plays helped the Chargers run their record to 3-0. Early in the 2nd quarter, the Seahawks reached 1st and Goal at the Chargers' one yard line, but had to settle for a field goal. The Chargers responded with a John Carney field goal and Natrone Means' 1 yard touchdown run, and led 10-3 at the half. Midway through the 3rd quarter, Seattle were threatening with a 1st and 10 at the San Diego 28, but Stanley Richard picked off a Rick Mirer pass and went 73 yards for his second touchdown of the season. Later, Humphries was sacked in his own one yard line by Brent Williams, bringing up a 3rd and 19. Humphries then hit Tony Martin in stride at the 35 yard line, and he outran the Seahawks' defence for a 99 yard touchdown, the seventh such pass in NFL history.

Week 4: at Los Angeles Raiders 

John Carney's 33-yard field goal with two seconds remaining preserved San Diego's unbeaten record, after they had let a twenty point lead slip in the 2nd half. Darrien Gordon's 90-yard punt return only three minutes into the game gave the Chargers a lead they built on with three Carney field goals and a 1-yard TD run by Natrone Means. Down 23-3 midway through the 3rd quarter, the Raiders began their comeback when Jeff Hostetler scrambled for a touchdown on 4th and goal, and completed it when Lionel Washington ran a deflected Humphries pass back 31 yards for another score. Humphries, who had injured his knee on the play, stayed in the game and led a 14 play, 65 yard drive to set up Carney's winning kick, the key play being an 8-yard completion to Ronnie Harmon on 4th and 1.

A loss by the New York Giants during San Diego's bye week left them as the last unbeaten team in the league for the first time as an NFL club.

Week 6: vs. Kansas City Chiefs 

A dominant performance by Natrone Means helped the Chargers reach 5-0 for the first time in 31 years. Means rushed for 125 yards on 19 carries, and played a major role in the only two touchdown drives of the game. Firstly, with San Diego up 6-3, he had runs of 9, 8, 6, 6 and 9 yards on five consecutive plays, the last of these a touchdown. In the 4th quarter, further rushes on 9, 25 and 23 yards helped set up a 5 yard touchdown pass from Stan Humphries to Mark Seay, making the score 20-6. The Chiefs gained 361 yards, but could muster only a pair of field goals from six trips into San Diego territory.

The Chargers debuted their powder blue throwback uniforms in this game.

Week 7: at New Orleans Saints 

Means again excelled, rushing for three touchdowns, and accounting for 120 of the Chargers' 198 rushing yards. San Diego led 24-0 early in the 2nd quarter, and John Carney's five field goals helped them stave off a Saints comeback thereafter.

Week 8: vs. Denver Broncos 

The Broncos, 1-5 heading into the game, handed the Chargers their first loss of the season. San Diego forced two turnovers in Broncos' territory in the first half, but struggled to capitalize on their openings and led only 12-7 at the break. A 43-yard touchdown pass from John Elway to Shannon Sharpe gave Denver their first lead, and Jason Elam's 54-yard field goal put them ahead to stay with 10:02 to play. San Diego drove into Denver territory in the final minute, but Humphries was knocked out of the game with an ankle injury, and backup Gale Gilbert threw four consecutive incompletions from the Denver 31.

Natrone Means ran for 100 yards in a losing cause, while John Carney made five field goals from as many attempts for the second game in a row.

Week 9: vs. Seattle Seahawks 

Stanley Richard forced two key turnovers either side of halftime, and the Chargers overcame an uncertain start, and the loss of Stan Humphries, to win comfortably. Seattle led 7-6 before Richard forced two fumbles from running back Chris Warren either side of halftime, both recovered by the Chargers, leading to touchdown runs from Ronnie Harmon and Natrone Means. Humphries had to leave the game with a dislocated left elbow in the 3rd quarter, but Gale Gilbert was solid in relief, completing 11 of 14 passes, for 125 yards and a pair of touchdowns, caught by Tony Martin and Alfred Pupunu. Means had 104 yards on 26 carries.

Week 10: at Atlanta Falcons 

A missed 47-yard field goal by John Carney with seven minutes to play cost the Chargers, as they were kept out of the end zone for the second time in three games. Gale Gilbert committed no turnovers, but had only one completion over 20 yards, and couldn't lead San Diego past midfield after Carney's miss. Natrone Means rushed for 102 yards, his fifth consecutive 100 yard game; this set a new club record, eventually broken by LaDainian Tomlinson in 2006.

Week 11: at Kansas City Chiefs 

The Chargers overcame four first half turnovers to earn a crucial divisional game. Kansas City entered the game a game back in the AFC West, and would have gone top on divisional record with a win.

Andre Coleman fumbled the opening kickoff, and though Stanley Richard soon picked off Joe Montana to offset the error, further fumbles by Means and Humphries followed, as well as a Humphries interception. In total, the Chiefs started five of their first nine drives in San Diego territory, but only led 13-0 at halftime. The game turned late in the third quarter, when Ron Dickerson was penalised for running into the kicker on a San Diego punt. Humphries hit Shaun Jefferson for a 52-yard touchdown on the next play. Midway through the 4th quarter, Darren Carrington intercepted Montana and returned the ball to the Chiefs' eight yard line. Humphries found a wide open Duane Young for the go-ahead score three plays later.

The Chargers forced a punt on the Chiefs' next possession, but had to punt themselves after Means was stopped two yards short of a first down at the two minute warning. Montana then converted two 4th downs, before finding Danan Hughes at the San Diego 31 with the clock running. Montana then spiked the ball an instant after the clock had expired, and the Chiefs had no opportunity to kick a game-winning field goal.

Week 12: at New England Patriots 

Former Charger Marion Butts rushed for 88 yards and a touchdown to lead the 4-6 Patriots to an upset win over the 8-2 Chargers. San Diego generated few threats on offense throughout the game, but only trailed 10-3 late in the 3rd quarter following Andre Coleman's 80 yard kickoff return touchdown. New England responded with a 12-play, 64-yard drive capped by Butts' 1 yard TD run. A 2-yard touchdown pass from Humphries to Martin came too late to affect the outcome.

Week 13: vs. Los Angeles Rams 

Four interceptions of Rams' quarterback Chris Miller helped the Chargers overcome a faltering offensive performance and dodge an upset defeat. Miller threw for two touchdowns in the 2nd quarter, to which the Chargers could only respond with a pair of field goals - they trailed 14-6 at the break. However, the Rams were forced to punt on their first possession of the second half, and Darrien Gordon returned the kick 75 yards up the left sideline for his second touchdown of the season. Ronnie Harmon then tied the scores with a two point conversion run, before catching a go-ahead touchdown pass from Humphries. The Rams responded by reaching a 3rd and 1 on the San Diego 7 yard line, but Gordon intercepted Miller in the endzone to preserve the lead.

Following an exchange of field goals, the Rams made a final bid to tie the scores, but Sean Vanhorse intercepted Miller's 4th down pass and returned it 50 yards for the clinching touchdown.

Week 14: vs. Los Angeles Raiders 

A loss by Kansas City earlier in the week left the Chargers one win from clinching the AFC West, but the Raiders, denied them on Monday Night Football. Unusually, four different quarterbacks threw touchdown to four different receivers in the first half alone, with Jeff Hostetler and Stan Humphries both picking up injuries and giving way to Vince Evans and Gale Gilbert respectively. Both returned in the 3rd quarter, which saw the Chargers drive inside the Los Angeles 20-yard line. Means then badly missed an open receiver on an HB option pass, before fumbling a few plays later. Following an exchange of field goals, Hostetler hit Rocket Ismail for the game-winner with seven minutes left; San Diego failed to cross the LA 40 after that.

Week 15: vs. San Francisco 49ers 

The Chargers missed their second chance to win their division, easily defeated by a 49ers team winning their ninth in a row. San Diego managed to cross the San Francisco 30 on their first possession, but Humphries was sacked attempting to convert a 4th and 8. Steve Young then led his team to three touchdowns in four possessions, and a 21-0 lead. In the second half, Natrone Means scored his first touchdown for six weeks, and Humphries found Tony Martin for another score, but the 49ers struck the final blow when Deion Sanders returned an interception for a 90-yard touchdown.

Humphries passed for a season-high 337 yards, while Martin caught nine passes for a career-high 172 yards. The 23-point margin of defeat would be repeated seven weeks later in Super Bowl XXIX.

Week 16: at New York Jets 

San Diego overcame a slow start to wrap up their division at the third time of asking. A pair of Nick Lowery field goals has the Jets up 6-0 approaching halftime, but a two-yard strike from Humphries to Mark Seay put the Chargers ahead to stay. A 44-yard Humphries-to-Martin connection extended the lead to eight points, then, after the defence stopped New York on downs, the same pair hooked up again for 60 yards and the clinching touchdown. Humphries completed 19 of 26 passes for 280 yards, three touchdowns and no interceptions - this game him a passer rating of 146.3, a career-high.

Week 17: vs. Pittsburgh Steelers 

San Diego earned a 1st round playoff bye on John Carney's 32 yard field goal 3 seconds from time. In a back-and-forth encounter, Andre Coleman's 90 yard kickoff return touchdown put the Chargers 10-3 ahead, before Pittsburgh went up 13-10 with a minute remaining in the half. The Chargers responded with a rapid 73 yard drive, capped by a Humphries-to-Seay touchdown pass. The pair connected again to convert a 4th and 4 on the first drive of the 3rd quarter, the key play of a 17-play drive culminating in a Means touchdown and a 24-13 lead.

Pittsburgh, who were assured of the #1 seed in the playoffs, had rested many of their starters by this point, but nonetheless rallied. Mike Tomczak led the team on three consecutive touchdown drives, putting them ahead 34-27 with 6:29 to play. Coleman broke off a 46 yard return on the ensuing kickoff, and the Chargers, now led by Gale Gilbert after another Humphries injury, soon reached a 4th and 1 on the Steelers' 20. Means then broke through off right tackle, surviving contact with numerous defenders en route to the end zone. After the defence forced a three-and-out, Means carried four times on a 34 yard drive to set up the winning kick.

Standings

Postseason

Game summaries

AFC Divisional Playoffs: Dolphins at Chargers 

The Chargers overcame a 21–6 halftime deficit by limiting the Dolphins offense to only 16 plays in the second half.

AFC Championship Game: Chargers at Steelers 

With the upset win over the Steelers, the Chargers went to their first Super Bowl.

Super Bowl XXIX: Chargers vs 49ers 

The heavily-favoured 49ers proved too strong for San Diego, going ahead 14-0 inside of 5 minutes, and coasting to victory.

Deaths of players 

The 1994 Chargers are also remembered for tragedy in the form of numerous untimely deaths, as nine of the players from that 1994 squad have died prematurely since that time.

 June 19, 1995 – Linebacker David Griggs died in a car accident when his vehicle slid off a ramp on Florida's Turnpike, linking to three roads just west of Fort Lauderdale and subsequently slammed into a pole, he was 28 years old.
 May 11, 1996 – Running back Rodney Culver and his wife Karen were among the 110 people (105 passengers, 5 crew members) aboard ValuJet Flight 592 when it crashed into the Florida Everglades, killing everyone aboard. He was 26 years old.
 July 21, 1998 – Linebacker Doug Miller died after being struck twice by lightning during a thunderstorm while camping in Colorado. He was 29 years old.
 May 11, 2008 – Center Curtis Whitley died of a drug overdose. His body was discovered by sheriff deputies in his trailer home in Fort Stockton, Texas, just one day after his 39th birthday. One of the drugs he was known to use was Crystal methamphetamine.
 October 15, 2008 – Defensive end Chris Mims was found dead in his Los Angeles apartment by police officers conducting a welfare check. The most likely cause of death was cardiac arrest due to an enlarged heart since he weighed  when he died. He was 38 years old.
 February 26, 2011 – Defensive tackle Shawn Lee died from a cardiac arrest resulting from double pneumonia. Lee had been suffering from diabetes for years prior to his death. He was 44 years old.
 December 8, 2011 – Linebacker Lewis Bush died from an apparent heart attack, just six days after his 42nd birthday.
 May 2, 2012 – Linebacker Junior Seau died in his home in Oceanside, California. Seau was discovered already lifeless by his girlfriend. His death was likely a suicide since a self-inflicted gunshot wound was apparent to the chest. He was 43 years old.
 April 30, 2021- Center Courtney Hall. Hall's death was announced on April 30, 2021.

References 

San Diego Chargers
San Diego Chargers seasons
AFC West championship seasons
American Football Conference championship seasons
San Diego Chargers f